Poecilotriccus is a genus of small flycatchers in the family Tyrannidae. Except for the recently described Johnson's tody-flycatcher, all have, at one point or another, been included in the genus Todirostrum. Some species have been known as tody-tyrants instead of tody-flycatchers. Most species are found in South America, but a single species, the slate-headed tody-flycatcher, is also found in Central America. The black-chested tyrant may also belong in this genus, but most place it in the monotypic genus Taeniotriccus.

Species
The genus contains 12 species:

References

 Walther, B. A. (2004). Genus Poecilotriccus. pp. 329–333 in:del Hoyo, J., Elliott, A. & Christie, D. A. eds. (2004). Handbook of the Birds of the World. Vol. 9. Cotingas to Pipits and Wagtails. Lynx Edicions, Barcelona. 

 
Bird genera
Taxonomy articles created by Polbot